New Amsterdam Records is a record label in New York City that was formed in 2008 by Judd Greenstein, Sarah Kirkland Snider, and William Brittelle to promote classically trained musicians who fall between traditional genre boundaries. Often abbreviated as NewAm, the organization has been hailed as a central force in creating the "indie-classical" scene., and was granted 501(c)(3) status in 2011 with the mission of "supporting and representing the post-genre new music community."

Background
New Amsterdam Records was founded to support the developing genre of music coming from people with great educations in composition who were also influenced by pop and jazz music and did not fit into the music industry binary of classical or pop.
NewAm has been described favorably by Seth Colter Walls in Newsweek as breaking down genre boundaries, "making a nice little tradition out of breaking tradition," and striking a healthy balance between old traditions (such as classical and jazz) and contemporary music."

In an interview with mental floss magazine, co-founder Judd Greenstein explains that they look for artists "whose work is a reflection of truly integrated musical influences. In other words, we don’t want classical-goes-rock or electronic-music-with-some-violins – we want music where people are being as personal and honest as they can be, while opening themselves up fully to all the music that they love."

Furthermore, in an interview with I Care If You Listen, co-founders and co-artistic directors William Brittelle, Judd Greenstein, and Sarah Kirkland Snider stated that “This variety stems from the inherent variety of individual composers not just as composers, but as listeners, each with a unique experience of listening to music in the world, and each therefore with a unique way of manifesting that experience in newly-created art. This is what we call a musical “voice,” and the voices of composers we release draw from an innumerable set of influences. A post-genre approach to composition inherently breeds a distinctiveness in those composers’ musical voices.”

Business model
Making an album can involve many costs, such as renting a recording studio, paying the musicians, creating album art, and manufacturing copies of the album. At New Amsterdam, the musician, not the label, picks up the cost of making the album, but the musician gets a higher percentage of royalties that come from sales.

In 2017, the label revamped its model to function as an all-in-one non-profit record label, presenter and artist service organization, aiming to create long-term sustainability in the face of a quickly changing music industry. Their support continues to extend far beyond album distribution, and artists continue to retain full ownership of their recordings. NewAm partners with artists to share the costs through project-specific fundraising and grants 100% of album sales directly to the artists.

In 2019 New Amsterdam announced two initiatives, including a new partnership with Nonesuch Records and the Windmill Series, a digitally-focused set of releases made available to subscribers in addition to the existing release schedule. The Nonesuch partnership sees the release of approximately three albums per year to support contemporary American composers in realizing ambitious creative projects, with initial releases from composers William Brittelle, Caroline Shaw, and Daniel Wohl. The Windmill Series has seen releases from artists including Arooj Aftab, Timo Andres, Gemma Peacocke, and more. After a subscription exclusivity period, Windmill Series releases are available digitally worldwide.

They are distributed by Naxos Records in North America.

Critical reception
Justin Davidson, music critic for New York, wrote, "They're part of this generation of people who get out of music school with all of these incredible skills, and all of this culture, and all of this creativity — fully aware that nobody is going to hand them a career. There's no superstructure of an established music industry that is going to pay any attention to these people, because they're not even paying attention to the much more established, mainstream conductors and violinists and orchestras. The ability to get noticed by having some record executive take an interest in you and record you — you know, that's really practically a thing of the past. If you want to make recordings, you've really got to do it yourself."

For New Amsterdam's and (Le) Poisson Rouge's 10-Year Anniversary show in 2018, Davidson write “In their decade of existence, (Le) Poisson Rouge and New Amsterdam have helped seed whole forests of music far beyond the five boroughs.”

NewAm have been compared to Bang on a Can, who also built their own label, community, and performance circuit, in a similar manner, 20 years ago. The difference, however, between the two is that Bang on a Can shared a common musical aesthetic — minimalism — whereas NewAm is more of a musical umbrella. NewAm's artists have become increasingly popular among a broad public while Bang on a Can's primary supporters continue to be larger, more established cultural institutions. "The interesting thing about this group of people, and New Amsterdam, is the real lack of interest in anything that you could call aesthetic categories, or rules about what does and doesn't belong in their sphere of influence," Justin Davidson says.

Selected discography

References

External links
 New Amsterdam Records official website
 NPR's All Things Considered feature
 An interview of New Amsterdam Records founder Judd Greenstein with publisher J.A. Tyler

Classical music record labels
Experimental music record labels
Jazz record labels
American independent record labels